Go Your Way may refer to:

 "Go Your Way" (song), a 2014 single by CNBLUE
 "Go Your Way", a 1969 single by Andromeda
 "Go Your Way", a 1965 song by Les Surfs
 "Go Your Way", a 1975 song by Marion Rung
 "Go Your Way", original 1971 song by Anne Briggs from Anne Briggs